The course landaise is an ancient form of bullfighting and bull-leaping held in oval or rectangular arenas covered in sand, that involves no bloodshed. Experienced cows, with large horns, aged generally from 2 to 14 years old, are used instead of bulls.  They are athletic but (by modern standards) small animals selected from the same breed as the bulls used for the Spanish .  In Gascony, it is a major spectator sport, counting as many as 600 events each year.

The  is one of various forms of entertainment involving a bull or a cow found throughout the south of France, and the Iberian peninsula.  The  is for the most part the main attraction of the yearly celebrations held in villages of western Gascony (Bas-Armagnac, Chalosse, and Bearn) and as far west as Bayonne.  Other forms of related entertainments are the running of the bulls made famous in the neighboring Spanish Basque Country by the Ferias of Pamplona, but also enjoyed in Bayonne and smaller towns of Gascony such as Nogaro. The  can in a way be compared with the steer-wrestling events in American rodeos to the extent that they are related expressions of a rural culture that can be traced to the ancient Basque tradition of Iberia. of running in front of bulls.

This form of bullfighting is a traditional game of cow or bull dodging and leaping. One needs courage, composure and agility to participate in this dangerous sport. The  are well-respected professionals but never earn enough to support themselves with the sport alone. However, their passion for this dangerous sport allows them to benefit from the full support of the aficionados throughout the region.

Explanation

The teams come from stock farms and wear, like any other team of sportsmen, their own colours. Each  wears an embroidered suit, which makes him recognizable to fans.

The cows are specially bred and grow up in the wild, on rural  (cattle farms or ranches) and are of a considerable size ( and ). They are extremely quick and can easily leap  fences. They are specially trained to defend themselves in their own natural way, and benefit from years of fighting in the arenas. The Ganaderias are mainly located in the Landes, in the region of Chalosse, essentially between Dax and Aire-sur-l'Adour.

Before the game starts they are all put in their own private cabin, called a loge. A rope is fixed around their horns in order to be able bring them during the game to their starting position.

The torero challenges the cow and to allow her to attack, calling out "Hup, hup!" The  lets out the rope, enabling the cow to attack.

The enthusiastic public continuously gives financial premiums for courage and audacity; these are announced between the festive music which is constantly playing.

The toreros are divided in two categories:

This is done with and sometimes without the protection of the rope. Judges are well placed to appreciate how close to the cow the écarteurs remain and reward them for their elegance, panache, composure and courage.

The cows are judged on their enthusiasm for the fight, agility and reliability to produce spectacular charges and the ganaderos compete for the honor of producing the best coursayres.

The athletes are supported by a cast of very experienced handlers who advise them and protect them from severe injury or humiliation... The Teneur de corde or cordier controls the dangling rope attached to cow's horns while the entraîneur positions the cow to face and attack the player.  They are generally former toreros, and their skill is very much appreciated and recognized by the knowledgeable fans.

The participants to this game are excellent athletes and generally peak in their early thirties since a lot of experience is necessary to dominate the wild cows.

The courses Landaises are held year round with the majority of events occurring from June to early October.  The most prized events are usually held in Nogaro, Bas-Armagnac in the Gers, (Corne d'Or, Championnat de France final), but the nearby region of Chalosse in the Landes is generally regarded as the cradle of the Course Landaise and hosts events year-round.

Origin

This form of bullfighting has been popular with Gascons for centuries. For example, in  Saint-Sever as early as 1457 during the Celebration of Saint John cows were released in the streets for a free run.

In La Teste-de-Buch it was tradition to brand the cows in the dunes. In sand the animal are less dangerous and there arose a game which existed in jumping over cows.

The  was regulated in the 19th century and transmitted to special arenas. Closer to Bordeaux, the tradition has mainly been lost, except in Floirac (Lot), La Brède and Captieux.

The three event types

Everything happens in style according to the ancient regulations. The participants to these courses are all professionals. It lasts approximately 2h15min with a pause. It always starts on the music of the "Marche cazérienne", a tune composed for the sport in 1900 by Fernand Tassine of the Mont-de-Marsan orchestra; with the écarteurs marching into the arena to the tune and formally saluting the public.

A jury stipulates a score which counts for the annual national competition.

The rules of the formal course Landaise are respected, but the classification in the national competition is individual. Here too its participants are all professionals.

The mixed courses are open for amateurs. The first part is formal and in the second part the public can participate.

In the popular resorts on the Atlantic coast of the Landes many events are organized in which the tourists can take part.

Sometimes the game is also played as part of a challenge to another village.  In this case, only amateurs participate, and the event is mostly centered on daring acts similar to those performed by the clowns in the rodeos.  Usually, younger, lighter animals are preferred to minimize injuries.  These challenges are called  ('inter-villages'), and the events can also incorporate other activities, such as swimming pools, seesaws, soccer or rugby games, caterpillar races, etc.

References

External links 

 The course landaise present events and photos.
 The site of the Fédération Française de la Course Landaise 
 The Course landaise in the Gers

French culture
Bullfighting
Bull-leaping